The National Health Service (Scotland) Act 1947 came into effect on 5 July 1948 and created the National Health Service in Scotland. Though the title 'National Health Service' implies one health service for the United Kingdom, in reality one NHS was created for England and Wales, accountable to the Secretary of State for Health and a separate NHS was created for Scotland, accountable to the Secretary of State for Scotland. Similar health services in Northern Ireland were created by the Northern Ireland Parliament through the Health Services Act (Northern Ireland) 1948.

Many sections of the Act were repealed by the National Health Service (Scotland) Act 1972 and the remaining provisions were repealed by the National Health Service (Scotland) Act 1978.

See also
 National Health Service Act 1946

References

United Kingdom Acts of Parliament 1947
NHS legislation
1947 in Scotland
NHS Scotland
Acts of the Parliament of the United Kingdom concerning Scotland
Welfare state in the United Kingdom
Health law in Scotland